Juliette Reilly is an American singer-songwriter and YouTuber.

Early life and education
Reilly was born in Columbus, Ohio to a Mr. and Mrs. Hayes A Reilly, and raised in Berkeley Heights, New Jersey. She graduated from Governor Livingston High School. In 2016, she graduated Phi Beta Kappa with a degree in music from Muhlenberg College.

Career
Reilly has been writing songs since age 11 and she has been singing and performing since age 6. In 2015, she won the Grand award at the SongDoor Songwriting Contest for her song "Hero." Her music videos on YouTube have had more than 6.7 million views and her channel has 180,000 subscribers.

Personal life
Reilly resided in Berkeley Heights, New Jersey.

Discography

Albums 
 Battle Cry (2016; Two Tree Records)
 I Am  (2016; Two Tree Records)
 My Virtual Escape (2018; Two Tree Records)
 LYGB (Love You Good Bye) (2019; Two Tree Records)

References

External links
 
 

20th-century births
Living people
People from Berkeley Heights, New Jersey
Singer-songwriters from New Jersey
Muhlenberg College alumni
American folk-pop singers
American YouTubers
American women singer-songwriters
21st-century American singers
21st-century American women singers
Year of birth missing (living people)